Antonín Kříž (born 24 August 1953) is a Czech biathlete. He competed in the 20 km individual event at the 1976 Winter Olympics.

References

External links
 

1953 births
Living people
Czech male biathletes
Olympic biathletes of Czechoslovakia
Biathletes at the 1976 Winter Olympics
People from Jilemnice
Sportspeople from the Liberec Region